The Olympic Hockey Center is a sports venue in Deodoro, Rio de Janeiro, Brazil. The centre was built for the 2007 Pan American Games before being totally rebuilt for the Olympic Field hockey competitions at the 2016 Summer Olympics. The Center was designed by the Brazilian studio Vigliecca & Associados, led by Arch. Ronald Werner Fiedler, Héctor Vigliecca and Luciene Quel.

References

Venues of the 2016 Summer Olympics
Olympic field hockey venues
Proposed sports venues in Brazil
Sports venues in Rio de Janeiro (city)
Deodoro Olympic Park
Sports venues completed in 2007